The Prix Iris for Best Costume Design is an annual film award, presented by Québec Cinéma as part of its Prix Iris awards program, to honour the year's best costume design in films made within the Cinema of Quebec.

The award was presented for the first time at the 6th Jutra Awards in 2004.

Until 2016, it was known as the Jutra Award for Best Costume Design in memory of influential Quebec film director Claude Jutra. Following the withdrawal of Jutra's name from the award, the 2016 award was presented under the name Québec Cinéma. The Prix Iris name was announced in October 2016.

2000s

2010s

2020s

See also
Canadian Screen Award for Best Costume Design

References

Awards established in 2004
Costume design awards
Costume Design
Quebec-related lists